Demodes immunda is a species of beetle in the family Cerambycidae. It was described by Newman in 1842.

References

Mesosini
Beetles described in 1842